Chaos Magick may refer to:
 Chaos magic, or chaos magick, a contemporary magical practice
 Chaos Magick (album), by Saturnian Mist, 2015

See also
 Chaos Magic (band)